Michael Summers may refer to:
Michael G. Summers (born 1972), American State Delegate from Maryland
Mike Summers (born 1952), Falkland Islands politician
Seven (record producer) (Michael Summers, born 1981), American hip hop producer

See also
Michael Sommer (disambiguation)